Ruth Higham (born 1978) is an English former glamour model from Harwood, Lancashire (a suburb of Bolton). She began appearing as a Page 3 girl in the Daily Star and The Sun newspapers in 1998.

Early life
Higham attended Canon Slade School in Bradshaw, Greater Manchester, which Sara Cox had also attended several years earlier. She became a beauty consultant for Max Factor.

Modelling
Higham was a Page 3 model from 1998 until around 2004. She first appeared on Page 3 of The Sun on 17 April 2000 and appeared in the newspaper 30 times. From 2002 to 2006, she was the model for Aintree-produced Big D peanuts; this caused a 35% increase in sales in 2003. She was also associated with a testicular cancer awareness campaign under the slogan "Say nuts to cancer". In April 2005, she starred in a television commercial for BT with Jeremy Clarkson. She has also appeared in advertisements for PS2 and Solpadeine. In 1999, she appeared in a web-based 'soap opera' called Launderama for detergent manufacturer ACDO in Bolton, where she played the part of Glo White in a tour of UK universities. She also appeared in a short drama series on the former channel Granada Breeze called 4Play, in which she played the role of a TV presenter based in Manchester. In February 2003, she appeared with two other models on Blind Date, becoming the first candidate to be rejected.

References

External links
 

1978 births
Glamour models
Living people
Page 3 girls
People from Bolton
People educated at Canon Slade School